Appia was a town of ancient Phrygia, inhabited during Hellenistic, Roman, and Byzantine times. According to Pliny the Elder, it belonged to the conventus of Synnada. It became the seat of a bishop in the ecclesiastical province of Phrygia Pacatiana; no longer a residential bishopric, it remains a titular see of the Roman Catholic Church.

Its site is located near Pınarcık in Asiatic Turkey.

References

Populated places in Phrygia
Former populated places in Turkey
Catholic titular sees in Asia
Roman towns and cities in Turkey
Populated places of the Byzantine Empire
History of Kütahya Province
Altıntaş District